Samuel Jameson Anderson (1824-1905) was a businessperson, lawyer and politician from Maine. He also was president of the Portland-Ogdensburg Railroad. Anderson, a Democrat, represented Portland in the Maine House of Representatives in 1876.

Anderson was named the initial president of the Portland and Ogdensburg Railroad Company when it was formed in 1869. He was the brother of one of the project's chief engineers, John E. Anderson.

References

1824 births
1905 deaths
Businesspeople from Portland, Maine
Politicians from Portland, Maine
Maine lawyers
Democratic Party members of the Maine House of Representatives
19th-century American railroad executives
19th-century American politicians